The Dukes Of Bröxstônia is an Australian short animated television series created by Suren Perera and Stu Connolly, aired on ABC3 for kid´s broadcast aired over 3 seasons. The show also airs on Disney XD in the United States and on Cartoon Network in Asia and Latin America.

Premise
The series is about 3 teenagers who make up a hard rocking punk band from Broxstonia. Singer Arj, drummer Barj and guitarist Larj are always on tour, enjoying fast but mad adventures, living the dream away from home despite their worst foes, rival band The Lukes of  Floxstônia.

Dukes Characters

 Arj – is the singer, his favourite food is donuts.
 Barj – is the drummer, has a terror of spiders, loves ice cream.
 Larj – is the guitarist of the band, has sky blue hair.

Lukes Characters

All Lukes have the first name Luke. They are a boy band from neighbouring Floxstônia. They are the Dukes' rivals.

Airing

Season 1
Season 1 was aired on ABC3 and contain 10 episodes of 45 seconds, premiering on 2 August 2010 and ending on 2 January 2011 and was presented on 480 SDTV format.

Season 2
Season 2 was aired on ABC3 and contain 10 episodes of 3 minutes, premiering on 10 January 2011 and ending on 23 January 2012 and was presented on 1080i HDTV format.

Season 3
Season 3 was aired on ABC3 and contain 10 episodes of 7 minutes (official running), premiering on 15 April 2013 and ending on 26 April 2013 and was presented on 1080i HDTV format.

References

http://kidscreen.com/2013/04/15/dukes-of-broxstonia-returns-in-longer-format/

http://kidscreen.com/2013/11/20/and-this-years-kidscreen-awards-nominees-are/

http://www.aacta.org/the-awards/3rd-aacta-awards/short-film-nominees.aspx

Australian Broadcasting Corporation original programming
Australian children's animated comedy television series
2010 Australian television series debuts
2013 Australian television series endings
2010s Australian animated television series
Australian flash animated television series
Animated television series without speech